Chart House is an American seafood restaurant chain owned by Landry's.

Location
There are 28 locations in the United States, as of 2015.  Chart House operates in the following cities:
 Boston
 Portland, Oregon

Reception

Zoe Baillargeon included the Portland restaurant in Eater Portland 2022 list of 15 restaurants "where the views are as good as the food".

References

External links

 

Seafood restaurants in the United States
Restaurant chains in the United States